Guy Torry is an American actor and comedian. He is the brother of actor and comedian Joe Torry. Torry created and hosted a weekly comedy show called Phat Tuesdays,

Filmography

Film

Television

References

External links

Living people
American male film actors
African-American male comedians
American male comedians
African-American film producers
American male screenwriters
American stand-up comedians
African-American male actors
American male television actors
21st-century American comedians
21st-century American screenwriters
21st-century American male writers
Year of birth missing (living people)
Place of birth missing (living people)
21st-century African-American writers
20th-century African-American people
African-American male writers